Alain Marie Pascal Prost (born 24 February 1955) is a French retired racing driver and Formula One team owner. A four-time Formula One World Drivers' Champion, from 1987 until 2001 he held the record for most Grand Prix victories until Michael Schumacher surpassed Prost's total of 51 victories at the 2001 Belgian Grand Prix. In 1999, Prost received the World Sports Award of the Century in the motor sport category.

Prost discovered karting at the age of 14 during a family holiday. He progressed through motor sport's junior ranks, winning the French and European Formula Three championships, before joining the McLaren Formula One team in 1980 at the age of 24. He finished in the points on his Formula One début – at the San Martín Autodrome in Buenos Aires, Argentina, where he took his first podium a year later – and took his first race victory a year later at his home Grand Prix in France, driving for the factory Renault team.

During the 1980s and early 1990s Prost formed a fierce sporting rivalry, mainly with Ayrton Senna but also Nelson Piquet and Nigel Mansell. In 1986, at Adelaide in the last race of the season, he beat Mansell and Piquet of Williams to the title, after Mansell retired late in the race and Piquet was pulled in for a late precautionary pit stop. Senna joined Prost at McLaren in 1988 and the two had a series of controversial clashes, including a collision at the 1989 Japanese Grand Prix that gave Prost his third Drivers' Championship. A year later at the same venue they collided again, but this time Prost, driving for Ferrari, lost out. Before the end of a winless 1991 season Prost was fired by Ferrari for his public criticism of the team. After a sabbatical in 1992, he joined the Williams team, prompting Mansell, the reigning Drivers' Champion, to leave for CART. With a competitive car, Prost won the 1993 championship and retired from Formula One driving at the end of the year.

In 1997, Prost took over the French Ligier team, running it as Prost Grand Prix until it went bankrupt in 2002. From 2003 to 2012 he competed in the Andros Trophy, an ice racing championship, taking 38 race victories and winning the championship three times. Prost employed a smooth, relaxed style behind the wheel, deliberately modelling himself on personal heroes like Jackie Stewart and Jim Clark. He was nicknamed "The Professor" for his intellectual approach to competition. Though it was not a name he particularly cared for, he would admit later that it was an appropriate summation of his approach to his racing. Skilled at setting up his car for race conditions, Prost would often conserve his brakes and tyres early in a race, leaving them fresher for a challenge at the end.

Early life
Alain Prost was born in the commune of Lorette near the town of Saint-Chamond, in the département of Loire close to Saint-Étienne, France to André Prost and Marie-Rose Karatchian, born in France of Armenian descent. Prost had one younger brother called Daniel, who died of cancer in September 1986. Prost was an active and athletic child, who enthusiastically took part in diverse sports, including wrestling, roller skating and football. In doing so he broke his nose several times. He considered careers as a gym instructor or a professional footballer before he discovered kart racing at the age of 14 while on a family holiday. This new sport quickly became his career of choice.

Prost won several karting championships in his teens. In 1974, he left school to become a full-time racer, supporting himself by tuning engines and becoming a kart distributor. His prize for winning the 1975 French senior karting championship was a season in French Formula Renault, a category in which he won the title and all but one race in 1976.

Prost went on to win the 1977 Formula Renault European championship before moving up to Formula Three (F3) in 1978. In 1979, he won both the French and European F3 championships, by which time he was on the shopping lists of several Formula One teams. He surprised the British team by declining their offer of a race drive in a third car at the final race of the 1979 season at Watkins Glen — reasoning that the token effort would benefit neither him nor the team. Prost felt that it would be a mistake to race in Formula One without being fully prepared: "..in the end I said, ‘No’ to Marlboro. I asked them to understand that I didn't want to make a mistake; I didn't know Watkins Glen and I didn't know the car. I said I thought it would be a better idea to organise a test."

Formula One

McLaren (1980)
Prost began his career with McLaren (being run by Teddy Mayer) in 1980 alongside Ulsterman John Watson. On his debut in Buenos Aires, Argentina, he finished in sixth place, earning one point, something achieved by only a handful of drivers. Prost added four more points to his tally during the season, scoring points at Interlagos, Brands Hatch and Zandvoort. Prost finished the year 15th in the Drivers' Championship, equalling points with former world champion Emerson Fittipaldi. Despite the encouraging debut season, Prost had several accidents, breaking his wrist during practice at Kyalami and suffering a concussion during practice at Watkins Glen. He also retired from the previous round in Montreal a week earlier because of rear suspension failure. At the end of the season, despite having two years remaining on his contract, he left McLaren and signed with Renault. Prost has said that he left because of the large number of breakages on the car and because he felt the team blamed him for some of the accidents.

Renault (1981–83)
Motor sports author Nigel Roebuck reports that there were problems between Prost and Arnoux from the start of the season, Prost being immediately quicker than his more experienced teammate. He did not finish the first two Grands Prix, due to collisions with Andrea de Cesaris in Long Beach and Didier Pironi at Jacarepaguá, but scored his first podium finish at Buenos Aires. He also did not finish in the next four races, and then won his first Formula One race at his home Grand Prix in France at the fast Dijon circuit, finishing two seconds ahead of his old teammate John Watson.

For Prost, his debut victory was memorable mostly for the change it made in his mindset. "Before, you thought you could do it," he said. "Now you know you can." Prost led from the start the next 5 races, and won two more races during the season, took his first pole position in Germany and finished on the podium every time he completed a race distance. He won again in Holland and Italy, and finished fifth in the Drivers' Championship, seven points behind champion Nelson Piquet.

Prost won the first two Grands Prix of the 1982 season in South Africa, where Prost recovered from losing a wheel, and Brazil, where he finished 3rd but was awarded the win after Piquet (1st) and Keke Rosberg (2nd) were disqualified. He finished in the points on four other occasions, but did not win again. Despite retiring from seven races, Prost improved on his Drivers' Championship position, finishing in fourth, but with nine fewer points than the previous year. His relationship with Arnoux deteriorated further after the French Grand Prix. Prost believes that Arnoux, who won the race, went back on a pre-race agreement to support Prost during the race. His relationship with the French media was also poor. He has since commented that "When I went to Renault the journalists wrote good things about me, but by 1982 I had become the bad guy. I think, to be honest, I had made the mistake of winning! The French don't really like winners."

In November 1982, three years before it became a round of the F1 World Championship, Prost, along with fellow F1 drivers Jacques Laffite and Nelson Piquet, made the trip to Melbourne, Australia to drive in the non-championship 1982 Australian Grand Prix at the short (1.609 km (1.000 mi)) Calder Park Raceway. Driving a Formula Pacific spec Ralt RT4 powered by a 1.6 litre Ford engine, Prost sat on pole for the race with a time of 39.18. He then led every lap to win what would be the first of 3 Australian Grand Prix wins. He finished 15.32 seconds clear of Laffite, with 1981 Australian Grand Prix winner, young Brazilian driver Roberto Moreno finishing third.

Prost earned a further four victories for Renault during the season and finished second in the Drivers' Championship, two points behind Nelson Piquet. Piquet and the Brabham team overhauled Prost and Renault in the last few races of the season. Prost, who felt the team had been too conservative in developing the car, found himself increasingly at odds with Renault's management, who made him the scapegoat for failing to win a championship. In addition to that, the French fans recalled the bitter fight that had caused their favourite, Arnoux, to leave the team. Prost said in an interview with ESPN during the final race that his car was "not competitive" and that he "didn't lose by my own fault" Renault fired Prost only two days after the South African race. He re-signed for McLaren for the 1984 season within days and moved his family home to Switzerland after Renault factory workers burned the second of 2 of Prost's cars, one of them being a Mercedes-Benz.

McLaren (1984–1989)

1984–1986
He lost the world championship to Lauda in the final race of the season in Portugal by half a point, despite winning seven races to Lauda's five, including winning in Portugal. Under Formula One regulations, Prost received only half of the nine points normally awarded for a victory.

In  Prost became the first French Formula One World Champion. He won five of the sixteen Grands Prix during the season. He had also won the San Marino Grand Prix, but was disqualified after his car was found to be 2 kg underweight in post-race scrutineering. Prost finished 20 points ahead of his closest rival, Michele Alboreto. Prost's performance in 1985 earned him the Légion d'honneur distinction in France.

Prost successfully defended his title, despite his car struggling against the Honda-powered Williams cars driven by Nelson Piquet and Nigel Mansell. Prost had the same number of wins as Piquet, but he had four second places to Piquet's three, thus placing him second before the final race. The Williams team then pitted Piquet to change tyres as a safety precaution, while Prost had already pitted earlier due to a puncture and did not need to change his tyres again. He then held the lead ahead of a charging Piquet to the chequered flag and the Championship. Prost became the first driver to retain the title since Jack Brabham in 1960.

He was cruising to victory when his car began to run out of fuel three corners from the chequered flag. Frantically weaving the car back and forth to slosh the last drops of fuel into the pickup, he managed to keep it running just long enough to creep over the line and win the race. Prost commented after the race that when his car started running dry he immediately thought to himself "shit, I am going to lose this race again", referring to his 1985 disqualification at Imola. It happened again at the : while running in fourth position, Prost's car ran out of fuel on the finishing straight of the last lap. Instead of retiring at a time in the season when points were critical, Prost got out of his car and tried to push it to the finish, to great applause from the crowd. The finish line was too far, though, and he never reached it. He was eventually classified sixth in the race, as the seventh-placed car (the Brabham-BMW of Derek Warwick) was a lap behind. As a result, the car's front suspension and engine mountings were bent, which badly affected its handling. It would behave one way in left hand corners and a completely different way in right hand corners. McLaren Technical Director John Barnard said afterwards that the car was "bent like a banana" upon the teams' post-race inspection of the car.

1987
With Rosberg retiring from Formula One at the end of 1986 season, underrated Swede Stefan Johansson filled the McLaren seat alongside Prost for the  season. Even though McLaren had introduced the new Steve Nichols designed MP4/3 after three seasons with the MP4/2 model (Barnard had departed for Ferrari), the TAG engines were not the force they had been previously, lagging behind in power and with unreliability previously unseen. He never gave up though and challenged Piquet and Mansell almost until the end, winning three races and breaking Jackie Stewart's record for race victories by winning for the 28th time at the Portuguese Grand Prix. “People might not believe me,” said Stewart at the time. “But I’m glad to see Alain take my record. I am glad that he has done it because he’s the one that deserves it. There is no doubt in my mind that he is the best race driver of his generation.” Prost considers his win in the opening round in Brazil as his best and most rewarding race ever. The Williams-Hondas had been dominant during qualifying, and Prost started fifth on the grid with a time three seconds slower than Mansell's pole time. Knowing he didn't have the qualifying speed, he instead worked on his race set-up, and with everyone else going for a high-downforce set-up, he went the other way. The set-up meant less tyre wear, thanks to slower speeds in the corners while going fast down the straights. With his car having less tyre wear than his rivals, Prost was able to get through the 61 laps of the abrasive Jacarepaguá Circuit with only two stops compared to the three or more by his rivals (Piquet pitted for tyres 3 times within the first 40 laps). Prost finished 40 seconds in front of Piquet, with Johansson a further 16 seconds back in third.

When you win a race like this the feeling is very, very good. There have been times when I have been flat-out to finish sixth, but you can't see that from the outside. In  I finished three or four times in seventh place. I pushed like mad, yet everyone was gathered around the winner and they were thinking that I was just trundling around. But that's motor racing. So in fact the only thing you can judge in this sport is the long term. You can judge a career or a season, but not one race.

Prost finished the 1987 season in fourth place in the championship behind Piquet, Mansell and Lotus driver Ayrton Senna. Prost finished 30 points behind champion Nelson Piquet.

Despite a slightly disappointing 1987 season, nevertheless by the end of that year Prost had the honour of notching up his 4th consecutive No.1 driver of the year by the editor of the Autocourse annual, matching Niki Lauda's run of No.1's from 1975 to 1978 in the same annual. Writing in 1987, the Autocourse editor mentioned that despite driving a down on power engine (compared to the Honda's) "Prost should have won at least 6 races in 1987 – but he won't moan about it. Despite being out of championship contention, 1987 was a memorable year for Prost. His win at Estoril was exceptional." In 1985, the Autocourse editor wrote of Prost: "In the long run, Ayrton Senna may be the better driver, but in 1985 for speed and consistency Prost had no equal", while in 1986, the Autocourse editor commented on Prost's season "Alain had an almost faultless year. 1986 was a year of Prost's outstanding all round ability."

1988

Prost had convinced Ron Dennis to sign Ayrton Senna to a three-year contract, which played a role in luring Honda (Senna's ability had been highly regarded by the Japanese giant when using their engines with Lotus in 1987 and both were keen to continue their association). However, this began the rivalry that pushed two of the sport's greatest drivers to unprecedented heights of success and controversy. McLaren-Honda dominated the season, winning 15 out of 16 races. Prost finished first or second in every race other than his two retirements at Silverstone and Monza. He won seven races and in total outscored his new teammate Senna by 11 points, despite Senna winning one more race than him. However, only the 11 best results from the season counted toward the championship total, and this gave Senna the title by three points. Prost went on to be a proponent of essentially the 1990s scoring system: all points counting toward the final results, with a race winner scoring 10 (rather than 9).

In November of that year, Prost had a meeting with the head of Honda's R&D department and F1 racing program, Nobuhiko Kawamoto in Geneva. He expressed his feelings that Honda was giving Senna preferential treatment, and Kawamoto then confirmed Prost's fears, explaining that the Honda engineers were of a new generation, and that they liked Senna's panache and "samurai"-like driving. Senna had already developed a close relationship with the Honda engineers during the 1987 season when he was at Lotus. Kawamoto was able to convince Prost that he would work something out on the Honda end of the McLaren-Honda partnership for the 1989 season, but this was not to be.

1989
McLaren's domination continued throughout , and the struggle between Prost and Senna for supremacy put them on a collision course. Mutual admiration turned to all-out hatred, with Prost accusing Senna of "dangerous driving" and of receiving more than a fair share of attention from both McLaren and Honda. For his part, Senna accused Prost of being in the pocket of FISA's French president Jean-Marie Balestre. The animosity between the two drivers came to a head at Round 2 in San Marino. The drivers made an agreement between them that whoever won the start would not be challenged by the other going into the first turn (in this case, the Tosa bend on the Imola circuit). Prost kept to the agreement after Senna won the first start. Prost however won the restart (caused by Gerhard Berger's fiery crash in his Ferrari), but was passed by Senna under brakes for Tosa. Prost went to a friend of his, a French journalist, and told him about the broken agreement between him and Senna. Against Prost's wishes, the journalist went public with the story. During testing at Pembrey in Wales, Senna denied in public any such agreement had ever existed between Prost and himself, but Prost's claim was backed up by Marlboro's John Hogan who had been present when the agreement was made.

Prost had the firm belief that Honda and Ron Dennis viewed Senna as the future of the team. Prost recalled that by the  he had one car with maybe four or five mechanics, while his teammate had two cars and 20 people around him. Before the race Prost, who had announced in July 1989 that he would depart from McLaren, announced he was joining Ferrari. Prost was forced to make a public apology to both McLaren and Honda over his Monza comments. However, Prost received support from Nigel Mansell (who would be his  teammate at Ferrari), and former teammate Rosberg who claimed that once it became known they would not be using the Japanese engines the next season, their Honda engines did not seem to work as well as was once normal. Until that point Prost's MP4/5 had not been a match for Senna's on Monza's long straights, which had many, especially those in the press, wondering if there was actually truth to Prost's claim that his Honda engines were not as good as the ones Senna was able to use. Prost actually won the Italian Grand Prix, after Senna's engine blew with only 9 laps remaining. To the delight of the tifosi whose team he signed for the 1990 season, at the rostrum Prost dropped his driver's trophy into the crowd, to the anger of Dennis who since changed McLaren's policy requiring that all trophies won by drivers belong to the team. Dennis was in fact so incensed at Prost that he threw his constructor's trophy at Prost's feet on the rostrum. Prost had a replica trophy made for Dennis but it sat in a cupboard for over 6 years.

As 1989 wore on, Prost continually claimed his Honda V10s were not producing the same amount of power as those in Senna's car. It actually got to the point where Honda F1 boss Osamu Goto felt compelled to speak to the specialist British media on the matter. He claimed that Senna's foot-tapping style with the accelerator helped keep the RA109-E's revs up in the engine's mid-range where most of the power was, while Prost's smoother style dropped the engines into low revs where they had a pick-up problem. Apparently the talk was convincing until most of those present noticed Goto continually called them Ayrton and Prost respectively (per Japanese customs, addressing a person by their first name rather than the surname shows a much higher degree of familiarity and confidentiality). His car was running less wing than Senna's which theoretically would give him greater top speed, Prost's McLaren was not able to pass Senna's on the long front straight even though he came off the final Peraltada Curve clearly faster than Senna and also had the benefit of a tow. In stark contrast, late in the race when Senna was lapping Prost (who was on fresh tyres), Senna was easily able to power past Prost on the straight.

Their embittered season ended as many pundits had feared. Prost, turning into the corner, turned into his teammate's path resulting in a collision and the cars sliding interlocked down the escape road. Prost, thinking the World Championship was over, climbed out of his stalled car. To separate the cars, the marshals pushed Senna's McLaren backwards onto the track. This left it in a dangerous position, so they pushed it forwards again. As they did so, Senna bump-started the engine. He drove through the chicane and rejoined. The nose of Senna's car was damaged and he had to pit, but he rejoined only five seconds behind the Benetton of Alessandro Nannini. On lap 50, Ayrton sliced past Nannini at the chicane to take the lead and won the race. But it was Nannini who appeared on the top step of the podium, race officials having excluded Senna for missing the chicane. McLaren appealed the decision, but the FIA Court of Appeal not only upheld the decision but fined Senna US$100,000 and gave him a suspended six-month ban. Thus, Prost clinched his third driver's title in controversial circumstances, later stating "Ayrton Senna came behind me, I didn’t see him come and I couldn’t do anything to avoid him. I am very sorry to have to finish the championship on such an incident".

Ferrari (1990–1991)

Prost signed to join Ferrari in 1990, becoming the first driver signed to the team after the death of team founder Enzo Ferrari in 1988. As reigning world champion, Prost took over as the team's lead driver and was said to have played on this status. Mansell recalls one incident where at the 1990 British Grand Prix, the car he drove didn't handle the same as in the previous race where he had taken pole position, and later found out from team mechanics that Prost saw Mansell as having a superior car and had them swapped without Mansell knowing. Prost won five races for Ferrari that year, in Brazil, Mexico, France, Britain and Spain. Notable among these was the Mexican Grand Prix, where he won after starting in 13th position. In both the Mexican and Spanish races, he led Mansell to Ferrari 1–2 finishes. The championship once again came to the penultimate round of the season in Japan with Prost trailing his McLaren adversary, Ayrton Senna, by nine points. As in 1989, a controversial collision between the two settled the race. At the first corner Senna, as admitted a year later, intentionally drove his race car into Prost's, taking them both out of the race and sealing the title in his favour. "What he did was disgusting," Prost said. "He is a man without value." Prost finished the season seven points behind Senna, and his Ferrari team were runners-up to McLaren.

Mansell left the Scuderia due to his unstable relationship with Prost, to rejoin Williams for the 1991 Formula One season. Mansell's replacement was Frenchman Jean Alesi, who had been impressive during the previous two years at Tyrrell. Ferrari had entered a downturn, partially as their famous V12 engine was no longer competitive against the smaller, lighter and more fuel efficient V10s of their competitors. The Ferrari chassis, despite a major revision by the French Grand Prix (F-643) was also not up to the level of the McLaren and the Williams models. Prost won no races, only getting onto the podium five times. He was replaced by Italian driver Gianni Morbidelli for the final race of the 1991 season and by another Italian, Ivan Capelli, for the following season. Despite being sacked, Prost received a significant payment from Ferrari to not drive for any other team.

1993: Williams
Prost performed pre-season testing for Ligier early in 1992 and later turned down an offer to drive for the team. After hearing that Prost would be his teammate again in 1993, Mansell left Williams to race in the CART series. Prost had a clause in his contract which prevented rival Ayrton Senna from joining the team that year. Prost was part of a new-look driver line-up at Williams, with test driver Damon Hill coming in to replace Riccardo Patrese, who had left to join Benetton.

Prost won his fourth and final title in a year when he was regularly challenged by teammate Hill and by Ayrton Senna. Shortly before the Portuguese Grand Prix in October 1993, Prost announced he would not defend his world title, because the clause in his contract did not extend to 1994 and Senna would be able to join Williams for the upcoming season, and instead opted to retire. At the season's end Prost held the record for most Grand Prix victories, a record that stood for almost a decade. On the podium in Adelaide in 1993, Prost's last race, he and Senna embraced. Prost was surprised by the gesture, as Senna had declined a handshake at the previous race. Prost's performances earned him an OBE.

German Michael Schumacher broke Prost's record of 51 Grand Prix wins during the 2001 season. He also shares the record for starting every race of a season from the front row (16, in ), with Ayrton Senna and Damon Hill. , he is the last Frenchman to have won his home Grand Prix.

Helmet

Prost used a helmet design based on the three colours of the French flag, blue, white and red, with his name along the side. During his early career Prost used a basic design of white all over with some blue detail around the visor (blue helmet with a white 180° flipped Y and red lines in the lower branch of the flipped Y and in the upper branch, surrounding the top). During Prost's time at Renault, he used more blue details, most notably around the rear of his helmet. Prost's helmet changed in 1985, as his helmet now had the blue detail around the front, surrounding the visor (with also a blue stripe on the side region, making the white area become a P) and a white ring with red lines surrounding the top (forming a white circle with a blue half in the rear of the top). Prost kept a similar design for his entry at Ferrari and Williams.
Sometimes Prost used variants of his helmet design. In 2007 he used his original design, but with the circle top all red and a red line in the lower chin area. In 2010, he used a pearl white helmet with silver flames and a blue-white-red-white-blue stripe on the visor, designed by Kaos Design.

Career legacy
Prost is widely regarded as one of the greatest ever Formula One drivers, and is considered by some to be the greatest Formula One driver of all time. In 2009, an Autosport survey taken by 217 Formula One drivers saw Prost voted as the fourth greatest Formula One driver of all time. In October 2020, The Economist ranked champion drivers by the relative importance of car quality to driver skill. According to this ranking, Prost is Formula One's third best driver of all time. In November 2020, Carteret Analytics used quantitative analysis methods to rank Formula One drivers. According to this ranking, Prost is Formula One's eighth best driver of all time. A 2022 mathematical analysis of all F1 drivers by f1-analysis.com put Prost as the 4th greatest driver of all time, and the second greatest once differences between different eras had been corrected for. In November 2022, Autosport ranked Prost as the statistical fourth best driver of all time.

Rivalry with Ayrton Senna

Prost's battles with Ayrton Senna were particularly notable. The rivalry originated in 1988, when Senna joined Prost at the McLaren team. Prost managed to edge Senna outwards, taking the lead as they went into the first corner, but remained angered by Senna's manoeuvre.

The rivalry intensified after the 1989 San Marino Grand Prix, where the two drivers had an agreement that neither would get in each other's way to the first corner (cf. 1982 San Marino Grand Prix). At the start, Senna got away in the lead and Prost followed him through the first corner without getting in his way. Gerhard Berger's crash on lap four stopped the race. At the restart, Prost got away the better of the two but Senna forced his way past him at the first corner, breaking the pair's agreement at the start of the race, leaving Prost furious. Senna argued that it was the restart. Prost himself was angered by McLaren apparently favouring Senna because of Senna's better relationship with engine supplier Honda, so he announced in mid-season that he had signed to race for Ferrari the following season. Prost mentioned many times during 1989 that he believed his car was not as competitive as Senna's, and even that this was confirmed to him by the CEO of Honda when Prost traveled to Japan. The information was actually confirmed during the French GP press conference when Ron Dennis said that Prost's car was consistently using more fuel, but not getting more power, than Senna's engine.

The rivalry reached its peak at the end of 1989, when the title was to be decided between Senna and Prost at Suzuka. The two McLarens collided at the Casio Triangle chicane when Prost blocked an attempted pass by Senna. Prost walked away while Senna returned to the track. Senna went on to win the race, but was later disqualified in a highly controversial ruling over his path back to the track, as his car was pushed through the road around the chicane. After an unsuccessful appeal by McLaren, Senna received a further US$100,000 fine and a six-month suspension, leading him to accuse FIA president Jean-Marie Balestre of favouring his compatriot Prost.

The following season saw the two drivers collide again. With Senna leading Prost, now in a Ferrari, in the world Drivers' Championship, Prost qualified second for the penultimate race of the season in Suzuka with Senna on pole. Senna was apparently told by a Steward that the pole position would be on one side of the track but discovered before the race that it would be actually be on the other side. Senna complained that no longer being on the racing line, his side of the grid was dirty, meaning he would get less grip (and therefore a slower start) than Prost who had been moved to the clean side of the grid. Senna's appeal was rejected. Prost almost retired from the sport, saying "What he did was disgusting. He is a man without value." A year later, Senna admitted that the move was premeditated, in retaliation for the collision at the chicane on the same course the previous year.

Prost's inferior Ferrari was unable to put up a challenge regularly to Senna's front running McLaren. At the German Grand Prix at Hockenheim, Prost battled Senna for 4th place, but he felt Senna defended too aggressively and at the first chicane forced Prost to take avoiding action by using the escape road. Prost stalled his car rejoining the race. Coincidentally, Senna ran out of fuel on the last lap at the very same point. At the following race, in Hungary, the FISA ordered a sit-down meeting between the two men, not wanting any repeats of the incidents from the previous two years.

Prost took a sabbatical in  after being fired from Ferrari for publicly criticizing the car and the team, and Senna struggled, because McLaren was no longer competitive with Williams. Prost announced his signing with Williams for the upcoming 1993 season. Senna too had wanted to join Williams, as they were the most competitive, but Prost had a clause in his contract excluding Senna as a teammate. An infuriated Senna called the Frenchman a "coward" during a press conference at Estoril, and decried his unwillingness to compete for the Drivers' Championship on equal sporting terms:

I think if Prost wants to be called the sole champion, three-times world champion, come back in a sportive way, maybe win another championship, he should be sportive. The way he's doing, he's behaving like a coward. And if he wants to be sportive, he must be prepared to race anybody, at any condition, at equal terms.

During the 1993 season, Prost and Senna continued their on-track rivalry. Prost was escorted by police to the Interlagos circuit for the 1993 Brazilian Grand Prix due to the hostility of Brazilians towards him. The two continued their on-track battles at Silverstone where Senna aggressively defended his position against Prost. At Prost's last Grand Prix, the 1993 Australian Grand Prix, he was pulled up by Senna onto the top step of the podium for an embrace.

Prost was a pallbearer at his funeral. Speaking four years after Senna's death, Prost told Nigel Roebuck that he had "always refused to speak about him". Prost stated that when Senna died "a part of himself had died also", because their careers had been so bound together. Senna had also felt the same when Prost had retired at the end of 1993, when he admitted to a close friend that he had realised how much of his motivation had come from fighting with Prost. Only a couple of days before his death, when filming an in-car lap of Imola for French television channel TF1, he greeted Prost, by then a pundit on the channel: "A special hello to my...to our dear friend, Alain. We all miss you Alain." Prost said that he was amazed and very touched by the comment.

Later life
During 1994 and 1995, Prost worked as TV pundit for the French TV channel TF1. He also worked for Renault as a PR man. Prost went back to his old team McLaren, working as a technical adviser; he also completed L'Étape du Tour, an annual mass-participation bike ride that takes place on a stage of the Tour de France. Although not an official race, riders fight hard for places; Prost finished 12th in his category, 42nd overall out of over 5000 riders.

Prost Grand Prix

During 1989 Prost began to contemplate starting his own team, as his relationship with his McLaren teammate, Ayrton Senna, had turned sour. Prost and John Barnard, formerly chief designer at McLaren, came close to founding a team in 1990; but a lack of sponsorship meant that this was not possible, so Prost moved to Ferrari and Barnard left Ferrari to join Benetton. After falling out with the Italian team at the end of 1991, Prost found himself without a drive for 1992; after the failure of extensive negotiations with Guy Ligier about buying his Ligier team, Prost decided to join Williams for 1993. By 1995, when Prost was working for Renault, people had assumed that a Prost-Renault team would be formed. Renault refused Prost's request to supply engines for his team, ending the speculation.

On 13 February 1997, Prost bought the Ligier team from Flavio Briatore and renamed it "Prost Grand Prix". The day after he bought the team, Prost signed a three-year deal with French car manufacturer Peugeot, who would supply the team with engines from  until . For the team's first season, Prost kept one of Ligier's 1996 drivers, Olivier Panis, who had won the Monaco Grand Prix the previous year; Japanese driver Shinji Nakano was signed to partner Panis. The team raced with the Mugen-Honda engines used by Ligier the previous season, while the car was actually the originally intended Ligier JS45, but was renamed the Prost JS45. Things looked promising at the start of the season, as the team picked up two points on its Grand Prix debut in Australia when Olivier Panis finished fifth. The team scored a further 13 points before Panis broke his leg in an accident during the Canadian Grand Prix. He was replaced by Minardi's Jarno Trulli. From there, things started to go downhill slightly, the team scored only five points during Panis's recovery. He came back at the end of the season to race in the last three Grands Prix. Prost GP finished sixth in the Constructors' Championship in its first season, with 21 points.

Prost became the president of Prost Grand Prix at the start of 1998. With Peugeot supplying the engines for Prost GP, Mugen-Honda decided to supply the Jordan team. Prost GP scored a single point during the season when Jarno Trulli finished sixth in Belgium.

 was a crucial year for Prost GP. Prost hired John Barnard as a technical consultant, Barnard's B3 Technologies company helping Loic Bigois with the design of the Prost AP02. Panis and Trulli agreed to stay on with the team for the season. The car was not a major concern but the Peugeot V10 engine proved to be heavy and unreliable.

Peugeot's final year as Prost's engine supplier in 2000 saw some optimism. Prost hired his 1991 Ferrari teammate Jean Alesi to drive the lead car and German Nick Heidfeld, who had won the 1999 Formula 3000 championship, to partner him. The season proved to be yet another disastrous one: the AP03 proved to be unreliable and ill handling. Things weren't helped when the drivers collided with each other in the Austrian Grand Prix. Newly hired technical director Alan Jenkins was fired midway through the year. Prost restructured the team, hiring Joan Villadelprat as the managing director and replacing Jenkins with Henri Durand as the team's new technical director.

In  Ferrari agreed to supply engines for the season. The money ran out at the start of the  season and Prost was out of business, leaving debts of around $30 million.

Other roles
During 2002, Prost spent time with his family and competed in eight bicycle races, finishing third in the Granite – Mont Lozère. The Frenchman raced in the Andros ice race series in 2003, finishing second in the championship behind Yvan Muller. In 2003 and 2004, Prost took part in the Étape du Tour. Prost also became an Ambassador for Uniroyal, a position he would keep until May 2006. Prost continued to compete in the Andros Trophy, winning the title with Toyota in 2006/07, 2007/08 and with Dacia in 2011/2012.

For the 2010 Formula One season, the Sporting Regulations were changed so that a former driver sits on the stewards' panel. Prost was the first such driver to take on this role, at the 2010 Bahrain Grand Prix. Prost also took part in the Race of Champions in 2010, a race organised for legends of motor sport to compete in equal machinery. In February 2012, Prost was named as Renault's new international ambassador, representing the company in sports demonstrations and at events organized or attended by Renault. Prost has finished the Absa Cape Epic, an eight-day 700 km mountain bike race in South Africa, twice. He first completed the race in 2012 with partner Sebastien di Pasqua and then again in 2013, and started but did not finish the race in 2014.

In October 2013, it was announced that Prost would join forces with Jean-Paul Driot's DAMS racing team to form e.dams, a team which would compete in the FIA Formula E Championship for electric racing cars from its commencement in September 2014. In June 2014, the team announced that its initial driver line-up would consist of Nicolas Prost and Sébastien Buemi. The team went on to win the inaugural Formula E teams championship. In 2017, he was employed as a special adviser for the Renault Formula One Team. Since July 2019, he took up a non-executive director role with Renault Sport. During the 1000th Formula One race, the 2019 Chinese Grand Prix, Prost had the honor of waving the chequered flag as Mercedes driver Lewis Hamilton crossed the line to take his 75th career victory. Prost continued in his role within Renault Formula One Team, renamed "Alpine F1 Team" in 2021, until January 2022, when his departure from the team was announced.

Personal life
Prost was married to Anne-Marie (born 14 February 1955), but they divorced sometime later. They have two sons, Nicolas (born 18 August 1981) and Sacha Prost (born 30 May 1990). Prost also has a daughter, Victoria, born from his relationship with Bernadette Cottin. From 2014 to 2018, Nicolas raced in Formula E for e.dams Renault, a team partially run by his father. Prost lived in his hometown, Saint-Chamond, until he and his Renault team fell out in the early 1980s. In April 1983 the Prost family moved to Sainte-Croix, Switzerland, and shortly after to Yens, Switzerland. They moved to Switzerland after Renault workers went to Prost's house in France and burned his Mercedes-Benz and another one of his road cars. They lived there until November 1999, when they moved to Nyon in the same country. Through Nicolas, Prost has two grandsons named Kimi (born November 2015) and Mika (born December 2020). Through Sacha, he has another grandson named Liam (born June 2018).

In 1986, Prost was awarded the Légion d'honneur by the French President, François Mitterrand; he was promoted from Chevalier to Officier rank in 1993. In addition, he was awarded an honorary British OBE in 1994, and the Brazilian Order of the Southern Cross in 1999. He was also inducted into the International Motorsports Hall of Fame and the FIA Hall of Fame in 1999 and 2017 respectively.

Racing record

Career summary

Complete European Formula 3 results
(key) (Races in bold indicate pole position) (Races in italics indicate fastest lap)

Complete Formula One World Championship results
(key) (Races in bold indicate pole position, races in italics indicate fastest lap)

† Did not finish, but was classified as he had completed more than 90% of the race distance.
‡ Race was stopped with less than 75% of laps completed, half points awarded.

Formula One non-championship results
(key) (Races in bold indicate pole position)
(Races in italics indicate fastest lap)

See also
 List of Formula One Grand Prix wins by Alain Prost

Explanatory notes

References

Further reading

External links

 Grand Prix History – Hall of Fame 
 Alain Prost statistics
 Alain Prost Biography – McLaren
 Alain Prost – Fan page: interviews, photos, statistics, regularly updated

Alain Prost
1955 births
Living people
Chevaliers of the Légion d'honneur
FIA European Formula 3 Championship drivers
Ferrari Formula One drivers
Formula E team owners
Formula One race winners
Formula One team owners
Formula One team principals
Formula One World Drivers' Champions
French Formula One drivers
French Formula Renault 2.0 drivers
French Formula Three Championship drivers
French people of Armenian descent
French racing drivers
Grand Prix Masters drivers
International Motorsports Hall of Fame inductees
McLaren Formula One drivers
Renault people
Honorary Officers of the Order of the British Empire
Sportspeople from Loire (department)
Renault Formula One drivers
Williams Formula One drivers
Karting World Championship drivers
Oreca drivers
BMW M drivers